Teddy Allen (born June 7, 1998) is an American basketball player who plays for the Wichita Sky Kings of The Basketball League. He played college basketball for the New Mexico State Aggies, West Virginia, Western Nebraska Community College, and Nebraska Cornhuskers. He also attended Wichita State but never played a game for the Shockers.

Early life and high school career
Allen was born in Phoenix, Arizona and grew up in Mesa, Arizona. He grew up in a household with an abusive father until he was 11. Allen initially attended Desert Ridge High School, but was dismissed from the school after fighting with another student. After attending Canyon Valley School and Highland High School and struggling with his mental health, he went to Boys Town, a treatment and education facility for at-risk youth in Boys Town, Nebraska, at the recommendation of his stepfather. As a junior, he averaged 26.6 points and 12.4 rebounds per game and was named second team All-Nebraska. Early in his senior season Allen's mother, Elise died of cancer. He averaged 31.6 points and 13 rebounds per game and was named the Nebraska Gatorade Player of the Year as a senior.

College career
Allen began his college career at West Virginia. He played in 35 games as a reserve and averaged seven points and 2.7 rebounds per game as a freshman. Following the end of the season, Allen announced that he would be leaving the program. 

Allen transferred to Wichita State. He applied for a waiver to play immediately instead of sit out the season per NCAA transfer rules, but the waiver request was denied and he redshirted the season. Allen was dismissed from the team during the summer entering his redshirt sophomore season after being arrested for suspicion of domestic violence. Following his dismissal, he enrolled at Western Nebraska Community College. In his lone season with the Cougars, Allen averaged an NJCAA–leading 31.4 points per game with 3.7 assists and 7.4 rebounds over 28 games. 

Allen committed to transfer to Nebraska in December of 2019. As a redshirt junior, he led the Cornhuskers with 16.5 points per game and also averaged 4.7 rebounds, 1.7 assists, and 1.3 steals per game in 22 games played. On February 23, 2021, Allen scored 41 points, tied for the second most in school history and setting the record for the most points scored in Pinnacle Bank Arena, in a 86–83 loss to Penn State. Allen left the program in March before the end of the season.

Allen joined New Mexico State as a graduate transfer and was eligible to play immediately. He scored 41 points, the most points by a NMSU player in 20 years, in a 77–63 point win against Abilene Christian on January 15, 2022. Allen was named the Western Athletic Conference (WAC) Player of the Year in his first season with the team. He was named the MVP of the 2022 WAC men's basketball tournament after scoring 35 points over two games. Allen scored 37 points for the Aggies in a 70–63 upset win over fifth-seeded UConn in the 2022 NCAA tournament. Following the end of the season, Allen announced that he would be entering the 2022 NBA draft and hiring an agent.

Professional career
Allen went unselected in the 2022 NBA Draft. He played in the 2022 NBA Summer League for the Denver Nuggets. Allen was signed by the Scarborough Shooting Stars of the Canadian Elite Basketball League (CEBL) for the remainder of the 2022 season.

Allen was signed by the Wichita Sky Kings of The Basketball League on November 30, 2022.

References

External links
West Virginia Mountaineers bio
Wichita State Shockers bio
Western Nebraska Cougars bio
Nebraska Cornhuskers bio
New Mexico State Aggies bio
RealGM profile

1998 births
Living people
African-American basketball players
American expatriate basketball people in Canada
American men's basketball players
Basketball players from Arizona
Nebraska Cornhuskers men's basketball players
New Mexico State Aggies men's basketball players
Scarborough Shooting Stars players
Shooting guards
Sportspeople from Mesa, Arizona
West Virginia Mountaineers men's basketball players
Western Nebraska Cougars men's basketball players